The High Sheriff of Londonderry City, or High Sheriff of Derry, is the sovereign's judicial representative in the city of Derry. High Sheriff of Londonderry is a title and position which was created in 1900 under the Local Government (Ireland) Act 1898, with Sir John Barre Johnson the first holder. Like other high sheriff positions, it is largely a ceremonial post today. The appointment is officially made by the Secretary of State for Northern Ireland on behalf of the King. The outgoing high sheriff nominates his or her successor, except in Belfast where councillors nominate a serving member of the city council. Prior to 1900 sheriffs, initially two per year, but later only one, were elected by the city council.

History
Initially an office for life, assigned by the sovereign, the high sheriff became annually appointed from the Provisions of Oxford in 1258. Besides his judicial importance, he has ceremonial and administrative functions and executes High Court writs.

The first (high) shrivalties were established before the Norman Conquest in 1066 and date back to Saxon times. In 1908, an Order in Council made the lord-lieutenant the sovereign's prime representative in a county and reduced the high sheriff's precedence. Despite this the office retains the responsibility for the preservation of law and order in a county.

While the office of high sheriff ceased to exist in those Irish counties which formed the Irish Free State in 1922, it is still present in the six counties and two county boroughs (Belfast and Derry) of Northern Ireland.

Sheriffs of the City of Londonderry

18th century

19th century

High Sheriffs of the City of Londonderry

21st century

References

 
Londonderry City
History of Derry (city)